Enzo Forletta (born 15 June 1994) is a French rugby union player who plays for  in the Top 14. His playing position is prop. He made his debut for France in the 2021 July rugby union tests against Australia.

Reference list

External links
itsrugby.co.uk profile

1994 births
French rugby union players
France international rugby union players
Living people
Sportspeople from Perpignan
Rugby union props
USA Perpignan players
Montpellier Hérault Rugby players